The Golden Horse Award for Best Live Action Short Film is an award presented annually at the Golden Horse Awards by the Taipei Golden Horse Film Festival Executive Committee. The latest ceremony was held in 2022, with Li Nien-hsiu winning the award for the film Can You Hear Me?.

References

Golden Horse Film Awards